Richard Jobson (born 6 October 1960) is a Scottish filmmaker (director, writer, producer) who also works as a television presenter. He is also known as the singer-songwriter of the band Skids.

Early life
Jobson was born in Kirkcaldy and grew up in Crosshill, Ballingry and Fife, the son of a miner and a worker at Rosyth Dockyard. He attended St Columba's Roman Catholic High School, Dunfermline. His family were of Irish Catholic descent.

Skids
Jobson is the lead singer with the punk rock group Skids, whose original run was from 1977 -1982. Jobson's singing style with Skids was highly distinctive, and he wrote the lyrics, while Stuart Adamson wrote most of the music.

Scared to Dance, the first Skids album, featured the 1979 hit single "Into the Valley", the group's most successful single. Jobson appeared on BBC Television's Top of the Pops singing it. The album also featured "The Saints are Coming", which he said was about the death of a friend in the British Army. Much of Scared to Dance features local references, and also Jobson's fascination with the two world wars.

The fourth album by Skids, Joy, released in 1981, was almost entirely written by Jobson and Russell Webb, as the other two band members left, one of whom was Jobson's long-time songwriting partner Stuart Adamson who moved on to form his new band Big Country.

In September 2006, it was announced that Green Day and U2 were to record a cover version of "The Saints are Coming" for charitable purposes.

Skids including Jobson reformed from 2007 to 2010, and again from 2016 to present.

Other musical work
Jobson and Russell Webb both shared a common interest in the War Poets, a theme which was in evidence for Jobson's solo album Ballad of Etiquette and which bore a credit for "Virginia & Josephine" (Wells). This album was released in November 1981, and peaked on the UK indie charts at number 24. At the same time Astley, Nicky Holland and Kate St John auditioned for Bill Drummond at the Zoo Club in Liverpool where they made their live debut.

In 1983, Jobson formed another band with Russell Webb and John McGeoch, called The Armoury Show — named after a 1913 New York modernist art exhibition. Jobson and Webb also worked with Virginia Astley. Webb co-produced her first album From Gardens Where We Feel Secure.

Both Astley and Jobson did recording sessions for Les Disques Du Crépuscule, a Belgian record label, and Jobson made several albums for the label, usually of poetry readings with Astley as his accompanist. At the same time the final Skids album Joy was released, Astley and Nicky Holland appeared as backing vocalists; Astley also played flute on the single "Fields".

Jobson was doing poetry readings at the Cabaret Futura Club, who issued an album on the Martyrwell label and which was engineered by Astley's brother Jon Astley. Amongst a lot of strange-sounding and difficult music was the first ever recording by Kissing the Pink.

For Crépuscule's various artists compilation LP The Fruit of the Original Sin, Jobson performed a poem called "Homage To Marguerite Duras" with music by Astley.

In the mid-1980s Astley and Jobson toured Japan to promote his album An Afternoon in Company. Much of Jobson's spoken-word material for the Cocteau and Crépuscule labels has been reissued on CD by the LTM label.

Television and film career
In the 1980s, Jobson became a presenter on 01 for London and as film reviewer for Sky Television. In June 2013, Jobson was awarded an honorary degree (Doctor of Arts) from Edinburgh Napier University.

Discography
With Skids

With The Armoury Show 

Solo

Filmography 
Features
Wayland's Song (2013) (director, writer)
The Somnambulists (2012) (director, writer)
New Town Killers (2008) (director, writer)
A Woman in Winter (2006) (director, writer)
The Purifiers (2004) (director, writer)
16 Years of Alcohol (2003) (director, writer)

Shorts
I Think You Need a Lawyer (2012) 
The Journey (2009)
Am I Digital (2009)
Arab Strap: Speed-Date (2005 music video)

Other
Heartlands (2002) (co-writer, producer)
Tube Tales (1999) (producer, actor)
The Skids Live 2010 (Skids reunion documentary)

He also presented a late-night series in some ITV regions called Hollywood Report. Katie Wagner worked as a reporter on the show. From 1988 to 1992, he presented an arts magazine programme called 01-For London.

References

External links
 Official website
 Domino Publishing profile
 The Guardian article
 

Scottish film directors
Skids (band) members
People with epilepsy
1960 births
Living people
21st-century Scottish male singers
The Armoury Show members
People from Ballingry
Scottish science fiction writers
Scottish screenwriters
Scottish people of Irish descent
20th-century Scottish male singers